A New Testament minuscule is a copy of a portion of the New Testament written in a small, cursive Greek script (developed from Uncial). Most of the minuscules are still written on parchment. Paper was used since the 12th century.

New Testament minuscules are distinct from:
 New Testament papyri — written on papyrus and more ancient than minuscules;
 New Testament uncials — written in uncial script (i.e. all capital letters) also more ancient than minuscules; and,
 New Testament lectionaries — usually written minuscule (but some in uncial) letters and generally contemporary.

Minuscules codices contain commentaries and other additional matter, like, Prolegomena to the four Gospels, the Epistula ad Carpianum, the treatise of Pseudo-Dorotheus on the Seventy disciples and twelve apostles (82, 93, 117, 459, 613), List of Lord's miracles (e.g. 536), List of Parables of Jesus (e.g. 273, 536), short biographies of the Apostles, or summaries of the journeys of St. Paul (e.g. 468). Since the 9th century some manuscripts have notes with the date and place of the composition of the different NT books. Some manuscripts informed about name of scribe and date of composition of the manuscript, but date usually reckoning from the creation of the world (5508 BC). It was the Byzantine manner. Only in a few minuscule codices is the date reckoned from the birth of Christ.

Classification of minuscules 

Since the time of J. J. Wettstein the minuscules manuscripts have been indicated by Arabic numerals, but the numbers in each of the four groups of the books of the New Testament began with 1, and thus "1" might indicate a book in any of the manuscripts (f.e. 1eap, 1r, 2e, 2ap). Different parts of the same manuscript had different numbers (f.e. 18evv, 113Acts, 132Paul, and 51Apoc belonged to the same manuscript). Only the first manuscript situation was simple, because it had number 1 in Gospels (1e), in Acts and Catholic epistles (1a), and in Pauline epistles (1p). This system was complicated. 
Scrivener, for instance, enumerated known for him minuscule codices: 
 Gospels .... 739
 Acts and Catholic epistles .... 261
 Pauline epistles .... 338
 Apocalypse .... 122
It did not mean that the total number of minuscules was 1460, because some of them belonged to the same manuscripts. 

Wettstein's system was improved and corrected by F. H. A. Scrivener, C. R. Gregory, and other scholars. Aland renumbered minuscule manuscripts (1r received number 2814, 2ap received 2815, 4ap received 2816 etc.), and now every minuscule manuscript has a different catalogue number. 

Renumbered minuscules: 
 1r received number 2814,
 2ap received 2815,
 4ap received 2816,
 7p received 2817,
 36a received 2818,
 753b received 2819,
 753c received 2820,
 60r received 2821,
 1274bap received 2822,
 1352bap received 2824,
 1674bap received 2825,
 1674cap received 2826,
 1674dap received 2827,
 1681bap received 2828,
 1755bap received 2829,
 1755cap received 2830,
 2306bap received 2831,
 2306cap received 2832,
 2306dap received 2833,
 2306eap received 2834,
 ℓ 1891ap received 2835.

Wettstein knew 112 minuscule codices of the Gospels, 58 of the Acts, 60 of St. Paul, and 28 of the Apocalypse. Manuscripts of the Gospels with number 260–469 were added to the list by Scholz (1794–1852). Gregory in 1908 knew 2292 all minuscule manuscripts of the New Testament. Now we have 2911 minuscule codices catalogued by the Institute for New Testament Textual Research (INTF) in Münster.

Lists of New Testament minuscules 
 List of New Testament minuscules (1–1000)
 List of New Testament minuscules (1001–2000)
 List of New Testament minuscules (2001–)
 List of New Testament minuscules ordered by Location/Institution

See also 

 Other lists
 Categories of New Testament manuscripts
 List of New Testament papyri
 List of New Testament uncials
 List of New Testament lectionaries
 List of New Testament Latin manuscripts
 List of the Syriac New Testament manuscripts
 Sortable articles
 Paleography
 Biblical manuscript
 Minuscule Greek

References

Bibliography 

 Scrivener, F.H.A., "A Plain Introduction to the Criticism of the New Testament", Fourth edition. Cambridge 1861, London 1894.
 Soden, Hermann von, "Die Schriften des Neuen Testaments, in ihrer ältesten erreichbaren Textgestalt hergestellt auf Grund ihrer Textgeschichte", Berlin 1902–1910.
 Caspar René Gregory, "Die griechischen Handschriften des Neuen Testaments"; Leipzig 1908.
 K. Aland, M. Welte, B. Köster, K. Junack, "Kurzgefasste Liste der griechischen Handschriften des Neuen Testaments", Walter de Gruyter, Berlin, New York 1994, pp. 47–215. 
 K. Aland, B. Aland, "The Text of the New Testament: An Introduction to the Critical Editions and to the Theory and Practice of Modern Text Criticism", trans. E. F. Rhodes, William B. Eerdmans Publishing Company, Grand Rapids, Michigan 1995 (3rd ed.).

External links 
 Sortable lists
 Peter M. Head, New Testament Minuscule Manuscripts
 New Testament Greek MSS ordered by century (Compiled by Maurice Robinson)
 Timothy Seid, A Table of Greek Manuscripts, Interpreting Ancient Manuscripts. [Retrieved 2012-02-29]
 Greek Manuscript Quick Reference – The Life Foundations Nexus
 "Continuation of the Manuscript List" INTF, University of Münster. Retrieved September 8, 2009
 Sortable articles
 The Mount Athos Greek Manuscripts Catalog
 Images of minuscules manuscripts
 Images of manuscripts at the CSNTM

Greek New Testament manuscripts